, also known as , was a waka poet and Japanese noblewoman active in the Heian period.
Her works were featured in several imperial poetry anthologies, including Shingoshūi Wakashū, Senzai Wakashū, Shokugosen Wakashū, Gyokuyō Wakashū, Shinsenzai Wakashū, Shinchokusen Wakashū, and others.

Poetry 
One of her poems is included in the Ogura Hyakunin Isshu:

External links 
E-text of her poems in Japanese

Japanese poets
Year of death unknown
Year of birth unknown
Hyakunin Isshu poets